In abstract algebra, a splitting field of a polynomial with coefficients in a field is the smallest field extension of that field over which the polynomial splits, i.e., decomposes into linear factors.

Definition
A splitting field of a polynomial p(X) over a field K is a field extension L of K over which p factors into linear factors

 

where  and for each  we have  with ai not necessarily distinct and such that the roots ai generate L over K. The extension L is then an extension of minimal degree over K in which p splits. It can be shown that such splitting fields exist and are unique up to isomorphism. The amount of freedom in that isomorphism is known as the Galois group of p (if we assume it is separable).

Properties
An extension L which is a splitting field for a set of polynomials p(X) over K is called a normal extension of K.

Given an algebraically closed field A containing K, there is a unique splitting field L of p between K and A, generated by the roots of p. If K is a subfield of the complex numbers, the existence is immediate. On the other hand, the existence of algebraic closures in general is often proved by 'passing to the limit' from the splitting field result, which therefore requires an independent proof to avoid circular reasoning.

Given a separable extension K′ of K, a Galois closure L of K′ is a type of splitting field, and also a Galois extension of K containing K′ that is minimal, in an obvious sense. Such a Galois closure should contain a splitting field for all the polynomials p over K that are minimal polynomials over K of elements a of K′.

Constructing splitting fields

Motivation
Finding roots of polynomials has been an important problem since the time of the ancient Greeks. By constructing the splitting field for such a polynomial one can find the roots of the polynomial in the new field.

The construction
Let F be a field and p(X) be a polynomial in the polynomial ring F[X] of degree n. The general process for constructing K, the splitting field of p(X) over F, is to construct a chain of fields  such that Ki is an extension of Ki&hairsp;−1 containing a new root of p(X). Since p(X) has at most n roots the construction will require at most n extensions. The steps for constructing Ki are given as follows:
 Factorize p(X) over Ki into irreducible factors .
 Choose any nonlinear irreducible factor f(X) = fi&hairsp;(X).
 Construct the field extension Ki&hairsp;+1 of Ki as the quotient ring Ki&hairsp;+1 = Ki&hairsp;[X] / (f(X)) where (f(X)) denotes the ideal in Ki&hairsp;[X] generated by f(X).
 Repeat the process for Ki&hairsp;+1 until p(X) completely factors.

The irreducible factor fi&hairsp;(X) used in the quotient construction may be chosen arbitrarily. Although different choices of factors may lead to different subfield sequences, the resulting splitting fields will be isomorphic.

Since f(X) is irreducible, (f(X)) is a maximal ideal of Ki&hairsp;[X] and Ki&hairsp;[X] / (f(X)) is, in fact, a field. Moreover, if we let  be the natural projection of the ring onto its quotient then

so π(X) is a root of f(X) and of p(X).

The degree of a single extension  is equal to the degree of the irreducible factor f(X).

The field Ki&hairsp;[X]/(f(X)) 
As mentioned above, the quotient ring Ki&hairsp;+1 = Ki&hairsp;[X]/(f(X)) is a field when f(X) is irreducible. Its elements are of the form

where the cj are in Ki and α = π(X). (If one considers Ki&hairsp;+1 as a vector space over Ki then the powers α j for  form a basis.)

The elements of Ki&hairsp;+1 can be considered as polynomials in α of degree less than n. Addition in Ki&hairsp;+1 is given by the rules for polynomial addition and multiplication is given by polynomial multiplication modulo f(X). That is, for g(α) and h(α) in Ki&hairsp;+1 their product is g(α)h(α) = r(α) where r(X) is the remainder of g(X)h(X) when divided by f(X) in Ki&hairsp;[X].

The remainder r(X) can be computed through long division of polynomials, however there is also a straightforward reduction rule that can be used to compute r(α) = g(α)h(α) directly. First let

The polynomial is over a field so one can take f(X) to be monic without loss of generality. Now α is a root of f(X), so

If the product g(α)h(α) has a term αm with  it can be reduced as follows:

.

As an example of the reduction rule, take Ki = Q[X], the ring of polynomials with rational coefficients, and take f(X) = X 7 − 2. Let  and h(α) = α&hairsp;3 +1 be two elements of Q[X]/(X 7 − 2). The reduction rule given by f(X) is α7 = 2 so

Examples

The complex numbers 

Thus:

If we identify  with (a,b) then we see that addition and multiplication are given by

We claim that, as a field, the quotient ring  is isomorphic to the complex numbers, C. A general complex number is of the form , where a and b are real numbers and  Addition and multiplication are given by

If we identify  with (a, b) then we see that addition and multiplication are given by

It is also obvious that the map  is both injective and surjective; meaning that  is a bijective homomorphism, i.e., an isomorphism. It follows that, as claimed: 

In 1847, Cauchy used this approach to define the complex numbers.

Cubic example 
Each root of  equals  times a cube root of unity. Therefore, if we denote the cube roots of unity by

 

any field containing two distinct roots of  will contain the quotient between two distinct cube roots of unity. Thus

This field is not the splitting field, but contains one (any) root.

Now, continuing the process, we obtain  which is indeed the splitting field and is spanned by the -basis .

Other examples
 The splitting field of xq − x over Fp is the unique finite field Fq for q = pn. Sometimes this field is denoted by GF(q).

 The splitting field of x2 + 1 over F7 is F49; the polynomial has no roots in F7, i.e., −1 is not a square there, because 7 is not congruent to 1 modulo 4.

 The splitting field of x2 − 1 over F7 is F7 since x2 − 1 = (x + 1)(x − 1) already splits into linear factors.

 We calculate the splitting field of f(x) = x3 + x + 1 over F2. It is easy to verify that f(x) has no roots in F2, hence f(x) is irreducible in F2[x]. Put r = x + (f(x)) in F2[x]/(f(x)) so F2(r&hairsp;) is a field and x3 + x + 1 = (x + r)(x2 + ax + b) in F2(r&hairsp;)[x]. Note that we can write + for − since the characteristic is two. Comparing coefficients shows that a = r and b = 1 + r 2. The elements of F2(r&hairsp;) can be listed as c + dr + er 2, where c, d, e are in F2. There are eight elements: 0, 1, r, 1 + r, r 2, 1 + r 2, r + r 2 and 1 + r + r 2. Substituting these in x2 + rx + 1 + r 2 we reach (r 2)2 + r(r 2) + 1 + r 2 = r 4 + r 3 + 1 + r 2 = 0, therefore x3 + x + 1 = (x + r)(x + r 2)(x + (r + r 2)) for r in F2[x]/(f(x)); E = F2(r&hairsp;) is a splitting field of x3 + x + 1 over F2.

Notes

References
 Dummit, David S., and Foote, Richard M. (1999). Abstract Algebra (2nd ed.). New York: John Wiley & Sons, Inc. .
 
 

Field (mathematics)